The following are the football (soccer) events of the year 1976 throughout the world.

Events
Copa Libertadores 1976: Won by Cruzeiro after defeating River Plate on an aggregate score of 3–2.
September 15 – Dutch club Roda JC makes its European debut with a defeat (2–1) in Brussels against Belgium's R.S.C. Anderlecht in the second round of the Cup Winners Cup.

Winners club national championship

Asia
 Qatar – Al-Rayyan SC

Europe
 – Liverpool
 – AS Saint-Étienne
 – Torino

Eredivisie – PSV Eindhoven
Eerste Divisie – HFC Haarlem
 – Stal Mielec
 – Real Madrid
 – Trabzonspor
 – Partizan

North America
 – Club América
 / :
 Toronto Metros-Croatia (NASL)

South America
 Argentina:
Metropolitano – Boca Juniors
Nacional – Boca Juniors
 Brazil: Internacional

International tournaments
 African Cup of Nations in Ethiopia (February 29 – 14 1976)
 
 
 
1976 British Home Championship (May 6 – May 15, 1976)

 UEFA European Football Championship in Yugoslavia (June 16 – 20 1976)
 
 
 
 AFC Asian Championship in Iran (June 3 – 13 1976)
 
 
 
Olympic Games in Montreal, Canada (July 18 – 31 1976)

Births

 January 18 – Pavel Mareš, Czech international footballer
 February 5 – John Aloisi, Australian international footballer
 February 7 – Daisuke Oku, Japanese international footballer (died 2014)
 February 13 – Maksim Proshin, former Russian professional football player
 February 19 – Fernando Falce, Uruguayan professional football referee
 February 26 – Mauro Lustrinelli, Swiss international footballer
 March 17 – Álvaro Recoba, Uruguayan international footballer
 March 19 – Alessandro Nesta, Italian international footballer
 April 1 – Clarence Seedorf, Dutch international footballer
 April 20 – Aldo Bobadilla, Paraguayan footballer
 April 23 – Darren Huckerby, English footballer and coach
 April 27 – Walter Pandiani, Uruguayan footballer
 May 2 – Amado Guevara, Honduran international footballer
 May 3 – Beto, Portuguese international footballer
 May 6 – Denny Landzaat, Dutch international footballer
 June 14 – Massimo Oddo, Italian international footballer
 June 23 – Patrick Vieira, French international footballer
 June 24 – Ricardo Alexandre dos Santos, Brazilian international footballer
 July 1 
 Ruud van Nistelrooy, Dutch international footballer
 Patrick Kluivert, Dutch international footballer
 July 5 – Nuno Gomes, Portuguese international footballer
 July 10 – Lars Ricken, German international footballer
 July 13 – Yevgeni Zhelyakov, Russian professional football coach and former player
 July 16 – Carlos Humberto Paredes, Paraguayan footballer
 July 17
 Anders Svensson, Swedish international footballer
 Marcos Senna, Spanish international footballer
 July 26 – Danny Ortiz, Guatemalan footballer (died 2004)
 August 11 – Tõnis Kalde, Estonian international footballer
 August 19 – Stephan Schmidt, German footballer and manager
 August 24 
 Björn van der Doelen, Dutch footballer
 Nordin Wooter, Surinamese-Dutch youth international
 August 26 – Giovanni Naboth, Mauritian footballer
 August 27 – Ysrael Zúñiga, Peruvian footballer
 August 28 – Federico Magallanes, Uruguayan international footballer
 August 29 – Jon Dahl Tomasson, Danish international footballer
 September 18 – Ronaldo, Brazilian international footballer
 September 26 – Michael Ballack, German international footballer
 September 27 – Francesco Totti, Italian international footballer
 September 29 – Andriy Shevchenko, Ukrainian international footballer
 October 4 – Mauro Camoranesi, Italian international footballer
 October 26 – Ralf Oehri, Liechtensteiner former association footballer
 October 28 – Martin Lepa, Estonian footballer
 November 26 – José Pablo Burtovoy, Argentine footballer
 December 25 – Atko Väikmeri, Estonian footballer
 December 31 – Yevgeni Fedotov, Russian professional football coach and former player

Deaths

November
 November 3 – Giuseppe Cavanna, Italian goalkeeper, winner of the 1934 FIFA World Cup. (70)

December
 December 25 – Conduelo Píriz, Uruguayan midfielder, winner of the 1930 FIFA World Cup. (71)

References

 
Association football by year